The color magenta has notable tints and shades.  These various colors are shown below.

Definition of magenta

Magenta is a color made up of equal parts of red and blue light. This would be the precise definition of the color as defined for computer display (the color #FF00FF shown in the color swatch above). It is a pure chroma on the RGB color wheel (Image of RGB color wheel:) midway between purple and rose. In HSV color space, magenta has a hue of 300°.

In a color proximity sense, a primary color has a color range of 120° (60° on each side of the color's hue) and any color has to be within that range to be considered a variation of that color. Secondary colors have a color range of 60° (30°), tertiary colors have a color range of 30° (15°), quaternary colors have a color range of 15° (7.5°), quinary colors have a color range of 7.5° (3.75°), and so on. Because magenta is located at a hue angle of 300°, it has a tertiary color range of 285° and 315°, and any color out of this range is more related to violet or rose than magenta.

Magenta is not a spectral but an extraspectral color: it cannot be generated by light of a single wavelength. Humans, being trichromats, can only see as far as 380 nanometers into the spectrum, i.e., as far as violet.

The hue magenta is the complement of green: magenta pigments absorb green light, thus magenta and green are opposite colors. This makes magenta an "extra-spectral color".

Three major historical variations of magenta

Magenta dye (original variation) (1860)

Before printer's magenta was invented in the 1890s for CMYK printing, and electric magenta was invented in the 1980s for computer displays, these two artificially engineered colors were preceded by the color displayed at right, which is the color originally called magenta made from coal tar dyes in the year 1859.
Besides being called original magenta, magenta dye color is also called rich magenta to distinguish it from the colors printer's magenta and electric magenta, shown below.

Magenta was one of the first aniline dyes, discovered shortly after the Battle of Magenta (1859), which occurred near the town of Magenta in northern Italy.  The color was originally called fuchsine or roseine, but for marketing purposes in 1860 the color name was changed to magenta after the battle. Hence, the color is named indirectly after the town.

Process magenta (pigment magenta) (printer's magenta) (1890s)

In color printing, the color called process magenta or pigment magenta is one of the three primary pigment colors which, along with yellow and cyan, constitute the three subtractive primary colors of pigment. (The secondary colors of pigment are blue, green, and red.) As such, the CMYK printing process was invented in the 1890s, when newspapers began to publish color comic strips.

Process magenta is not an RGB color, and there is no fixed conversion from CMYK primaries to RGB. Different formulations are used for printer's ink, so there can be variations in the printed color that is pure magenta ink. A typical formulation of process magenta is shown in the color box at right. The source of the color shown at right is the color magenta that is shown in the diagram located at the bottom of the following website offering tintbooks for CMYK printing: .

Web colors magenta and fuchsia (1990s)

Magenta,  shown at the right, is one of the three secondary colors in the RGB color model, used to make all the colors on computer and television displays. It is made by a mixture of red and blue light at equal intensity.  It is called magenta on X11 list of color names, and fuchsia on the HTML color list.  The web colors magenta and fuchsia are exactly the same color.  Sometimes the web color magenta is called electric magenta or electronic magenta.

Additional variations of magenta

Magenta (Pantone)

Displayed at right is the color magenta (Pantone), i.e., the color that is called magenta in the Pantone color system.

The source of this color is the "Pantone Textile Paper eXtended (TPX)" color list, color #17-2036 TPX—Magenta.

Magenta (Crayola)

At right is displayed a Crayola color formulated in 1949; it was originally called brilliant rose but the name was changed in 1958 to magenta.

This color has a hue angle of 329, which is close to the hue angle of the color rose, which is 330.

Dark magenta

Displayed at right is the web color dark magenta.

Hot magenta

Displayed at right is the color hot magenta.

This color was formulated by Crayola in 1986.

Magenta haze

Displayed at right is the color magenta haze.

The source of this color is the "Pantone Textile Paper eXtended (TPX)" color list, color #18-2525 TPX—Magenta Haze.

Quinacridone magenta

At right is displayed the color quinacridone magenta.

Quinacridone magenta is a color made from quinacridone pigment.  It is sold in tubes at art supply stores.  By mixing various amounts of white with it, artists may create a wide range of light, bright, brilliant, vivid, rich, or deep tints of magenta.

Sky magenta

Displayed at right is the color sky magenta.  The color sky magenta is a representation of the color of the sky near the sun during the brief period during twilight when the pink of sunset transitions into the blue of early evening. This color was one of the colors in the set of Venus Paradise colored pencils, a popular brand of colored pencils in the 1950s.

This color is also called medium lavender pink.

A photograph of the sky displaying the color sky magenta in its natural context by photographer Dave Horne  is displayed here:

Telemagenta

Displayed at right is the color telemagenta.

This is one of the colors in the RAL color matching system, a color system widely used in Europe.  The RAL color list first originated in 1927, and it reached its present form in 1961.

Amaranth

Amaranth (color) is a reddish-rose color that is a representation of the color of the flower of the amaranth plant. The color amaranth purple is displayed at right.

Orchid

The color orchid, since it has a hue code of 302, may be classified as a rich tone of magenta.  Orchid is a representation of the color of the orchid flower.

The first recorded use of orchid as a color name in English was in 1915.

In 1987, orchid was included as one of the X11 colors.  After the invention of the World Wide Web in 1991, these became known as the X11 web colors.

Pale purple

Pale purple is a pale tint of magenta despite it being called a purple.

Plum

The color plum, since it has a hue code of 307, may be regarded as a dark tone of magenta.  The color plum is a close representation of the average color of the plum fruit.

The first recorded use of plum as a color name in English was in 1805.

Purple pizzazz

Displayed at right is the color purple pizzazz.

This color was formulated by Crayola in 1990.

Razzle dazzle rose

Displayed at right is the color razzle dazzle rose.

This color is a vivid tone of rose tending toward magenta.

This is a Crayola crayon color formulated in 1972 and called hot magenta. In 1990 the name changed to razzle dazzle rose.

Rose quartz

There is a grayish shade of magenta that is called rose quartz.

The first recorded use of rose quartz as a color name in English was in 1926.

Shocking pink

Shocking pink (the original 1937 shocking pink) takes its name from the tone of pink used in the lettering on the box of the perfume called Shocking, designed by Leonor Fini for the Surrealist fashion designer Elsa Schiaparelli in 1937.

Shocking pink (Crayola)

Displayed at right is the Crayola color shocking pink.

This is a Crayola crayon color formulated in 1972 and called ultra pink. In 1990 the name was changed to shocking pink.

Steel pink

The color steel pink is displayed at right.

The color steel pink was introduced by Crayola in January 2011, when the Ultra Hot and Super Cool set of Crayola colored pencils was fully introduced.

"Steel pink" is a deep tone of magenta.

Web color violet

Although called violet, it is actually a shade of magenta.

African violet

The color African violet is displayed at right.

The source of this color is the "Pantone Textile Paper eXtended (TPX)" color list, color #16-3250 TPX—African Violet.

English violet

The color English violet is displayed at right.

The first recorded use of English violet as a color name in English was in 1928.

Chinese violet

The color Chinese violet is displayed at right.

The first recorded use of Chinese violet as a color name in English was in 1912.

The source of this color is the "Pantone Textile Paper eXtended (TPX)" color list, color #18-3418 TPX—Chinese Violet.

Japanese violet

The color Japanese violet is shown at right.

This is the color called "violet" in the traditional Japanese colors group, a group of colors in use since beginning in 660 CE in the form of various dyes 
that are used in designing kimono.

Finn

The color Finn is displayed at right.

Finn is a dark magenta color.

See also 
 Index of color-related articles
 Fuchsia (color)
 Lists of colors
 Rose (color)

References

External links 
 How the color magenta was discovered in 1859 through research into coal tar (aniline) dyes.
 Pictures of actual aniline dye samples in various shades of magenta.

 
Shades
Shades
Shades